The 2002–03 Macedonian Football Cup was the 11th season of Macedonia's football knockout competition. FK Pobeda were the defending champions, having won their first title. The 2002–03 champions were FK Cementarnica 55 who won their first title as well.

Competition calendar

First round
Matches were played on 4 August 2002.

|colspan="3" style="background-color:#97DEFF" align=center|4 August 2002

|}

Second round
The first legs were played on 25 September and second were played on 30 October 2002.

|}

Quarter-finals
The first legs were played on 2 November and second were played on 27 November 2002.

|}

Semi-finals
The first legs were played on 19 March and the second were played on 23 April 2003.

Summary

|}

Matches

Cementarnica 55 won 2–1 on aggregate.

Sloga Jugomagnat won 2–1 on aggregate.

Final

See also
2002–03 Macedonian First Football League
2002–03 Macedonian Second Football League

External links
 2002–03 Macedonian Football Cup at rsssf.org
 2002–03 Macedonian Football Cup at FFM.mk

Macedonia
Cup
Macedonian Football Cup seasons